was a town located in Yamagata District, Hiroshima Prefecture, Japan.

As of 2003, the town had an estimated population of 3,057 and a density of 15.91 persons per km2. The total area was 192.09 km2.

On October 1, 2004, Togouchi, along with the town of Kake, and the village of Tsutsuga (all from Yamagata District), was merged to create the town of Akiōta.

External links
 Official website of Akiōta 

Dissolved municipalities of Hiroshima Prefecture